was a Japanese historian, novelist, and plublisher.

Early life

In 1935, while teaching at his mother in law's school in Kikuchi, Araki published the novel , but it was banned immediately after its first publishing on the grounds that it promoted liberalism and corrupted public morals.

Wartime actvity
In late 1944, Araki was pressed into service digging underground air-raid shelters on the island of Ōyano-jima. In 1945, he was involved as a laborer in construction at the Kumamoto Military Airfield. However, they quickly surrendered to the Americans and the militia was disarmed without any fighting.

Postwar
In 1946, Araki opened a bookstore and resumed writing. He was later involved in the memorialization of Kumamoto landmarks, including the former residence of Lafcadio Hearn, as well as local archival and historiographical research and preservation. Araki was an authority on the history of the Shinpūren rebellion. In the 1960s, he collaborated with Yukio Mishima's preparatory research for The Sea of Fertility.

Araki died of an intracranial hemorrhage at the Kumamoto University Hospital in 1981.

References 

1907 births
1981 deaths
20th-century Japanese historians
Writers from Kumamoto Prefecture
People from Kumamoto Prefecture